The Hundred and Four, or Council of 104 (Phoenician Miat, from the Mia - "hundred"), was a Carthaginian tribunal of judges.  They were created early in Carthage's history, and are described in Aristotle's Politics (4th century BC) as "the highest constitutional authority."  The Hundred and Four were in charge of judging generals and the military, who exercised a great deal of independence from the government in Carthage.  The Hundred and Four were intended to provide a check to ensure the military served the needs of the senate and the people. However, by the time of Hannibal, and his stint as Suffet (early 2nd century BC), the 104 had acquired tyrannical power.

By leading a populist reform movement—including substituting annual rotation in office for the life tenure formerly enjoyed by the 104—Hannibal managed to restore a measure of popular rule.  Until Hannibal's reforms the Hundred and Four held their position for life.  During Hannibal's term as Suffett he used popular support to change the term to a year and to add a term limit of two years.

Endnotes

References
Warmington, B.H. Carthage, A History, Barnes and Noble Books, 1993.

Carthage